The 5th Beijing College Student Film Festival was held in 1998 in Beijing, China.

Awards
 Best Film Award: Genghis Khan
 Best Director Award: Zhang Yang for Spicy Love Soup
 Best Actor Award: Wang Xueqi for Red Suit
 Best Actress Award: Ai Liya for Genghis Khan
 Best Visual Effects Award: Spicy Love Soup
 Artistic Exploration Award: Sun Bird
 Committee Special Award: Red River Valley, The Great Military March Forward: Pursue and wipe Out in the South
 Special Jury Award: Bearing Father to School, Superconductor
 Best Documentary Award: Foreign Affairs: Zhou Enlai
 Favorite Film: Foreign Affairs: Zhou Enlai
 Favorite Actor Award: Ge You for The Dream Factory
 Favorite Actress Award: Ning Jing for Red River Valley

References

External links

Beijing College Student Film Festival
1998 film festivals
1998 festivals in Asia
Bei